St. Francis de Sales High School was a coeducational Catholic high school in Detroit, Michigan, United States.  The school closed in 1971.  Since 1994, the school building has been home to Loyola High School.

References

High schools in Detroit
Defunct Catholic secondary schools in Michigan